Scribes is a lightweight free text editor for GNOME licensed under the terms of the GPL-2.0-or-later license.

Features
Its features include crash-recovery via automatic saving, syntax highlighting, snippets, automatic word completion, pair character completion, smart indentation, bookmarks, and various text editing functions. However, it does not provide the options to turn off some of those features, such as involuntary automatic saving (which can overwrite the old version of opened file without user's consent).

Official description
"Scribes focuses on streamlining your workflow. It does so by ensuring that common and repetitive operations are intelligently automated and also by eliminating factors that prevent you from focusing on your tasks.

The result is a text editor that provides a fluid user experience, that is easy and fun to use and that ensures the safety of your documents at all times."

References

External links
 
 Bug reports
 Linux.com review
 

 Ubuntuforums.org forum discussion
 

Linux text editors
Free text editors